Victor Eugene "Gene" Renuart Jr. (born November 26, 1949) is a retired United States Air Force four-star general. His last military assignment was as the commander of United States Northern Command and North American Aerospace Defense Command from March 23, 2007, to May 19, 2010. Prior to that, he served as director of strategic plans and policy, the Joint Staff. Renuart retired from the Air Force on July 1, 2010, after over 39 years of service.

Military career
Renuart entered the United States Air Force in 1971 following graduation from Indiana University. He was commissioned through the Officer Training School in 1972 and attended Undergraduate Pilot Training. He has commanded a fighter squadron, a NATO support group, a fighter wing and a composite wing. He served as commander of the 76th Fighter Squadron during Operations Desert Shield and Desert Storm, and supported Operation Deny Flight as director of plans for the NATO Combined Air Operations Center at Headquarters 5th Allied Tactical Air Force. In addition, he commanded Joint Task Force – Southwest Asia (JTF-SWA) and 9th Air and Space Expeditionary Task Force – Southwest Asia (9 ASETF) at Eskan Village in Riyadh, Saudi Arabia, where he was responsible for the control and execution of Operation Southern Watch. Renuart then served as the director of operations (CCJ3) at Headquarters, United States Central Command (USCENTCOM) at MacDill AFB, Florida, and the USCENTCOM Forward Headquarters at Camp As Sayliyah in Doha, Qatar, where he oversaw the planning and execution of all joint and allied combat, humanitarian assistance and reconstruction operations for Operations Enduring Freedom and Iraqi Freedom. He also served as vice commander, Pacific Air Forces (PACAF), where he was responsible for Air Force and Air Component Commander activities for the commander, United States Pacific Command (USPACOM). He has flown combat missions in Operations Desert Storm, Deny Flight, Northern Watch and Southern Watch.

Prior to assuming his final position, Renuart was the director of strategic plans and policy for the Joint Staff (J5) and senior military assistant to the Secretary of Defense. He provided strategic intelligence, policy guidance and planning focus to develop and execute the National Military Strategy in support of worldwide national security operations, politico-military affairs, international negotiations and organizational issues through coordination with the combatant commands, the services, OSD, defense agencies, other U.S. government agencies and international organizations.

Education
1967 Graduate from Christopher Columbus High School in Miami, Florida
1971 Bachelor of Science degree in production and industrial management, Indiana University, Bloomington
1975 Master of Arts degree in psychology, Troy State University, Troy, Alabama
1977 Distinguished graduate, Squadron Officer School, Maxwell AFB, Alabama
1979 Air Command and Staff College, Maxwell AFB, Alabama
1992 Army War College, Carlisle Barracks, Pennsylvania
1997 Senior Officers in National Security Program, Johns Hopkins University, Baltimore, Maryland

Assignments
January 1972 – March 1973, student, undergraduate pilot training, 3640th Pilot Training Wing/38th Flying Training Wing, Laredo AFB, Texas
March 1973 – July 1976, T-37 instructor pilot, 29th Flying Training Wing, Craig AFB, Alabama
July 1976 – September 1979, assistant professor of aerospace studies (Air Force ROTC Detachment 225, University of Notre Dame, South Bend, Indiana
September 1979 – April 1980, student, AT-38 and A-10 training, Holloman AFB, New Mexico, and Davis-Monthan AFB, Arizona
May 1980 – June 1982, A-10 instructor pilot and flight commander, 92nd Tactical Fighter Squadron, 81st Tactical Fighter Wing, Royal Air Force Bentwaters, England
June 1982 – July 1984, operations officer, Detachment 2, 81st Tactical Fighter Wing, Detachment 2, Leipheim Air Base, West Germany
July 1984 – November 1985, operations inspector, Office of the Inspector General, Headquarters U.S. Air Forces in Europe, Ramstein AB, West Germany
November 1985 – September 1986, executive officer to the inspector general, Headquarters U.S. Air Forces in Europe, Ramstein AB, West Germany
September 1986 – July 1991, chief of wing inspections, 23rd Tactical Fighter Wing, later, operations officer, later, commander, 76th Tactical Fighter Squadron, England AFB, Louisiana
July 1991 – July 1992, student, Army War College, Carlisle Barracks, Pennsylvania
July 1992 – March 1993, director of assignments, deputy chief of staff for personnel, Headquarters U.S. Air Forces in Europe, Ramstein AB, Germany
March 1993 – October 1994, commander, Headquarters Support Group, Allied Air Forces Central Europe, NATO, Ramstein AB, Germany
October 1994 – June 1995, executive to the assistant chief of staff for operations, Operations Directorate, and senior U.S. representative, Allied Air Forces Central Europe, NATO, Ramstein AB, Germany (November 1994 – May 1995, director of plans, NATO Combined Air Operations Center, 5th Allied Tactical Air Force, Vicenza, Italy)
June 1995 – April 1996, assistant director of operations, Headquarters U.S. Air Forces in Europe, Ramstein AB, Germany
April 1996 – June 1998, commander, 52nd Fighter Wing, Spangdahlem AB, Germany
July 1998 – March 2000, commander, 347th Wing, Moody AFB, Georgia
April 2000 – May 2001, commander, Joint Task Force-Southwest Asia and commander, 9th Air and Space Expeditionary Task Force-Southwest Asia, U.S. Central Command, Riyadh, Saudi Arabia
June 2001 – November 2003, director of operations (J-3), U.S. Central Command, MacDill AFB, Florida
December 2003 – August 2005, vice commander, Pacific Air Forces, Hickam AFB, Hawaii
August 2005 – August 2006, director for strategic plans and policy, the Joint Staff, Washington, D.C.
August 2006 – February 2007, Senior Military Assistant to the Secretary of Defense, Washington, D.C.
March 2007 – May 2010, United States Northern Command (USNORTHCOM) and commander, North American Aerospace Defense Command (NORAD).

Flight information
Rating: Command pilot
Flight hours: More than 3,800, including 60 combat missions
Aircraft flown: T-37, T-38, AT-38, A-10, F-16, F-15, C-130/HC-130 and HH-60

Major awards and decorations

Effective dates of promotion

References

External links

Living people
United States Air Force generals
Recipients of the Legion of Merit
Recipients of the Air Medal
Recipients of the Meritorious Service Decoration
1949 births
Recipients of the Defense Superior Service Medal
Recipients of the Defense Distinguished Service Medal
Recipients of the Air Force Distinguished Service Medal
Christopher Columbus High School (Miami-Dade County, Florida) alumni